Invesco, based in Henley-on-Thames, Oxfordshire, is one of the largest investment managers in the United Kingdom, managing £91.59bn in assets on behalf of individual clients, fund platforms, nominees, pension funds and other corporate institutions.

Invesco (UK) forms part of Invesco Ltd, an investment manager listed on the New York Stock Exchange.  The Invesco Perpetual name was retired in 2018, as Invesco moved to operate all of its brands under the name Invesco.

History
The company was founded in 1973 by Martyn Arbib as Perpetual Limited. In 2001, Arbib sold the business to the American AMVESCAP Group, which was renamed Invesco in 2008.

Queen Elizabeth II visited the company in 1998 to open its new headquarters, after opening the nearby River and Rowing Museum. Invesco Perpetual and The Arbib Foundation are benefactors of the museum.

The company logo is a graphic image of Ama Dablam, a 6,856 m (22,493 ft) mountain in the Himalaya range of eastern Nepal.

Structure
Invesco is a business name of Invesco Asset Management Limited and Invesco Fund Managers Limited, both of which are authorised and regulated by the Financial Conduct Authority.

References

Financial services companies established in 1973
Investment management companies of the United Kingdom
Henley-on-Thames
Companies based in Oxfordshire